Carter Hall can refer to:

 Carter Hall (Millwood, Virginia), the  estate of Lt.Col. Nathaniel Burwell (1750–1814), now a conference center owned by Project Hope
 Two U.S. Navy ships have been named in honor of Carter Hall:
 USS Carter Hall (LSD-3) (1943–1969)
 USS Carter Hall (LSD-50) (1993— )
 Hawkman (Carter Hall), the DC Comics superhero
 A brand of pipe tobacco sold by John Middleton Co.

Architectural disambiguation pages